Our Lady of the Underpass was a salt stain and purported appearance of the Virgin Mary under the Kennedy Expressway along Fullerton Avenue in Chicago that was noticed in 2005. The site became a pilgrimage site for local Catholics. Later it became a target for various acts of vandalism. The Illinois Department of Transportation judged that the stain was probably formed by salt run-off.

Cultural influence
Tanya Saracho wrote a play about the event called Our Lady of the Underpass, which was nominated for a Jeff Award.

Media

See also
Marian apparition

References

Marian apparitions
Events in Chicago
Christianity in Chicago